Jacques Decrion (born 18 November 1961) is a French former professional racing cyclist. He rode in one edition of the Tour de France, two editions of the Giro d'Italia and three editions of the Vuelta a España.

References

External links

1961 births
Living people
French male cyclists
Sportspeople from Besançon
Cyclists from Bourgogne-Franche-Comté